The National Order of Faithful Service is the second highest national order of Romania, with the Order of the Star of Romania being the highest national order. Originally it was established as the Medal of Faithful Service in 1878, during the reign of King Carol I. In 1906, the Cross of Faithful Service was added to the existing medal, as a superior class. During the reign of King Carol II, in 1932, the Order was established with four ranks: grand cross, grand officer, commodore, and officer. 

Between 1940 and 1948, only the medal was awarded. It was discontinued by the communist authorities in 1948, along with all the other Romanian decorations. It was re-instituted on 31 March 2000, alongside the Cross and Medal of Faithful Service. It differs from the 1932 version in the number of ranks, an order of knight (the lowest) being added. Is awarded for special services to Romania. It is also awarded to foreign nationals.

Ranks 
The order is awarded in three classes (Civil, Military – Peacetime & Military – Wartime) and is composed of 5 levels: 

 Grand Cross;
 Grand Officer;
 Commander;
 Officer; 
 Knight.

There is also a National Cross of Faithful Service and a National Medal of Faithful Service.

Insignia 
The ribbon (for civilians and peacetime military) of the order is nowadays light blue with a white central stripe:

Notable recipients 
 King Michael I of Romania with collar and diamonds as final sovereign of the order during the Kingdom of Romania;
 Princess Madeleine, Duchess of Hälsingland and Gästrikland (2008);
 Prince Carl Philip, Duke of Värmland (2008);
 Iancu Țucărman;
 Radu Câmpeanu, Knight (2002).

References

External links
World Medal Index – Republic of Romania: Order of Faithful Service

 
Romanian decorations
Military awards and decorations of Romania
Faithful Service, Order of
Awards established in 1932